Inauguration of Franklin D. Roosevelt may refer to:

 First inauguration of Franklin D. Roosevelt, 1933
 Second inauguration of Franklin D. Roosevelt, 1937
 Third inauguration of Franklin D. Roosevelt, 1941
 Fourth inauguration of Franklin D. Roosevelt, 1945

See also